Harvey Sollberger (born May 11, 1938 in Cedar Rapids, Iowa) is an American composer, flutist, and conductor specializing in contemporary classical music.

Life

Sollberger holds an M.A. degree from Columbia University, where his composition instructors included Jack Beeson and Otto Luening. In 1962 he co-founded (with Charles Wuorinen) The Group for Contemporary Music in New York City, which he directed for 27 years.

He is emeritus professor of music at the University of California, San Diego.
He taught at Columbia University, the Manhattan School of Music, and Indiana University. From 1997 to 2005 he served as Music Director of the La Jolla Symphony and Chorus.

His music has been released on Composers Recordings, Inc.

He currently lives in Strawberry Point, Iowa.

Awards
 1969 Guggenheim Fellowship
 Fromm commission
 Koussevitzky commission
 Naumberg Foundations commission
 National Endowment for the Arts

References

External links

"Sollberger", Classical Composers Database
"Harvey Sollberger", DRAM
Harvey Sollberger page
Interview with Harvey Sollberger, January 21, 1994

1938 births
Living people
American male classical composers
American classical composers
20th-century classical composers
American classical flautists
American male conductors (music)
Manhattan School of Music faculty
Musicians from Cedar Rapids, Iowa
University of California, San Diego faculty
Columbia University alumni
Contemporary classical music performers
Pupils of Jack Beeson
Pupils of Otto Luening
Musicians from Iowa
20th-century American composers
20th-century American conductors (music)
21st-century American conductors (music)
20th-century American male musicians
21st-century American male musicians
20th-century flautists
21st-century flautists